The  are an annual Japanese film award. The first awards were given to films made in 1991. This award is hosted by Hiroo Ōtaka.

Categories
Best Film
Best Director
Best Actor
Best Actress

Editions

1st (1991)
2nd (1992)
3rd (1993)
4th (1994)
5th (1995)
6th (1996)
7th (1997)
8th (1998)
9th (1999)
10th (2000)
11th (2001)
12th (2002)
13th (2003)
14th (2004)
15th (2005)
16th (2006)
17th (2007)
18th (2008)
19th (2009)
20th (2010)
21st (2011)
22nd (2012)
23rd (2013)
24th (2014)

References

External links
 Official website 
  
  
 Japanese Professional Movie Awards on allcinema 
 Japanese Professional Movie Awards on IMDb

Japanese film awards
1991 establishments in Japan
Annual events in Japan
Recurring events established in 1991